Gerard B. Dillon (died 3 December 1962) was an Irish Fianna Fáil politician. He was a member of Seanad Éireann from 1960 to 1961. He was elected to the 9th Seanad at a by-election on 1 November 1960, replacing Patrick Teehan on the Administrative Panel. He did not contest the 1961 election.

He served as Mayor of Limerick from 1949 to 1950.

References

Year of birth missing
1962 deaths
Fianna Fáil senators
Members of the 9th Seanad